Troy Streckenbach (born 1972) is an American politician. From Green Bay, Wisconsin, Streckenbach currently serves as Brown County Executive, having taken office in April 2011 and being re-elected in 2015 and 2019. Streckenbach is up for re-election again in 2023.

Streckenbach is a life-long resident of Brown County and grew up in the Green Bay area. Streckenbach graduated from the University of Wisconsin–Oshkosh with a degree in International Studies and an emphasis in Business and Political Science. Streckenbach has owned and operated six businesses in Brown County for the past 16 years.

Notes

External links
Government website 
Campaign website

1972 births
Living people
Politicians from Green Bay, Wisconsin
University of Wisconsin–Oshkosh alumni
County executives in Wisconsin
Wisconsin Republicans
21st-century American politicians